Bruunilla nealae is a deep-sea scale worm that is known from a single specimen collected from the Clarion-Clipperton Fracture Zone in the Pacific Ocean from a depth of about 5000 m.

Description
Bruunilla nealae is a short-bodied worm with up to about 18 segments and 8 pairs of elytra. It is pale white and slightly translucent in life, but a pale yellow when preserved in ethanol. The species lacks lateral antennae and the notochaetae are thinner than the neurochaetae.

References

Phyllodocida